Dewey Soriano (February 8, 1920 – April 6, 1998) was the part-owner of the Seattle Pilots baseball team of the American League in 1969, the franchise's only year in Seattle.

Born in Prince Rupert, British Columbia, Soriano moved to Seattle with his family when he was five. He played baseball at Franklin High School in Seattle; among his teammates on the Quakers were Fred Hutchinson and newspaper columnist Emmett Watson.

Prior to owning the Pilots, Soriano served as president of both the Pacific Coast League and the Western International League.  Soriano also pitched in the minor leagues for several years before becoming the owner and player-manager of the Yakima Bears.

When Soriano won the Pilots expansion franchise in late 1967, he didn't have enough money to pay the franchise fee.  In what proved to be a harbinger of things to come, he had to ask for help from former Cleveland Indians owner Bill Daley — who, ironically, had nearly moved the Indians to Seattle earlier in the 1960s. In return, Soriano sold Daley a 47 percent stake in the team, making him the largest shareholder.  Soriano, however, retained the team presidency.  Largely due to being badly undercapitalized, Soriano was nearly out of money by the end of the 1969 season.

Almost as soon as the season ended, it was apparent that Soriano wouldn't be able to hold out before moving to a new stadium.  It was also apparent that the timetable for a new park would have to be significantly advanced, as the Pilots' temporary home, Sick's Stadium, was completely inadequate even for temporary use.  Soriano put the Pilots on the market, but no credible offers surfaced from Seattle interests.  Out of desperation, Soriano cut a deal to sell the franchise to a Milwaukee-based group led by Bud Selig.  However, legal action dragged out throughout the 1969–1970 offseason.  Ultimately, Soriano took the team into bankruptcy, clearing the way for Selig to take control and move the Pilots to Milwaukee as the Milwaukee Brewers. 
After the move to Milwaukee was finalized in late March, Soriano and his brother Max were hung in effigy in Seattle.
After seven summers without major league baseball in Seattle, the expansion Mariners began play in 1977.

Soriano married Alice Brougham, daughter of Royal Brougham (1894–1978), longtime sports editor of the Seattle Post-Intelligencer newspaper.

References

External links

Milwaukee Brewers timeline
Dewey Soriano obituary
Sports Press Northwest - Wayback Machine: Dewey Soriano Story, Part I
Part II

1920 births
1998 deaths
Baseball executives
Baseball people from British Columbia
Canadian emigrants to the United States
Seattle Pilots
Businesspeople from Seattle
Minor league baseball players
Pacific Coast League
20th-century American businesspeople
Franklin High School (Seattle) alumni